The Hamburger Morgenpost (Hamburg Morning Post) (also known as Mopo) is a daily German newspaper published in Hamburg in tabloid format.

As of 2006 the Hamburger Morgenpost was the second-largest newspaper in Hamburg after Bild Zeitung.

History and profile

The Hamburger Morgenpost was founded in 1949 by the Hamburg section of the Social Democratic Party (SPD) with a circulation of 6,000 copies. Until the late 1950s, the circulation increased to 450,000 copies. When Bild Zeitung was brought out by the Axel Springer publishing house as a second tabloid serving Hamburg, the circulation of the Hamburger Morgenpost declined steadily. Due to the existing competition with other newspapers, such as the 1948 re-founded Hamburger Abendblatt, there was a decline in interest in political party-owned newspapers in Hamburg. The SPD sold the newspaper following financial problems in the mid-1970s. After having several owners, the Gruner + Jahr publishing company bought it in 1986. In 1989, its circulation had fallen to 135,000.  In 1999, Gruner + Jahr sold the newspaper in to Frank Otto and Hans Barlach. In 2006, the BV Deutsche Zeitungsholding, a company of David Montgomery's Mecom Group and Veronis Suhler Stevenson International, bought the newspaper. In 2009, Mecom Group sold it to the Cologne-based private publishing company DuMont Schauberg.

The circulation of the Hamburger Morgenpost was 115,845 copies in the second quarter of 2009.

Editor-in-chiefs 
 1985–1986: Nils von der Heyde
 1986: Jürgen Juckel
 1986–1989: Wolfgang Clement
 1989–1992: Ernst Fischer
 1992–1994: Wolf Heckmann
 1994–1996: Manfred von Thien
 1996–1998: Mathias Döpfner
 1998–2000: Marion Horn
 2000–2006: Josef Depenbrock
 2006–2008: Matthias Onken
 2008–2020: Frank Niggemeier
 since 2020: Maik Koltermann

2015 arson 

In response to the terrorist attack on Charlie Hebdo in which 12 people died on January 7, 2015, some international organizations such as Reporters Without Borders called for controversial Charlie Hebdo cartoons to be re-published in solidarity with the French satirical magazine and in defense of free speech. The Hamburger Morgenpost included Charlie Hebdo cartoons on its front cover on January 8 and other publications such as Germany's Berliner Kurier and Poland's Gazeta Wyborcza reprinted cartoons from Charlie Hebdo the day after the attack; the former depicted Muhammad reading Charlie Hebdo whilst bathing in blood. At least three Danish newspapers featured Charlie Hebdo cartoons, and the tabloid BT used a Charlie Hebdo image depicting Muhammad lamenting being loved by "idiots" on its cover.

The newspaper was attacked by an arsonist on January 11, possibly relating to the cartoons.

References

External links
  

1949 establishments in West Germany
Daily newspapers published in Germany
German-language newspapers
Newspapers published in Hamburg
Newspapers established in 1949